Bombolulu is a suburb of Mombasa, Kenya. located off the Mombasa-Malindi highway. Bombolulu is also known as 67 Bombolulu, The name came by when artists from different parts of Mombasa started beefing and therefore giving their neighborhoods area codes. 67 Bombolulu is a growing town.

Some local artists from 67 Bombolulu are Melo Banjo, Billy The Gemini Nyota, Mangi safaree, hamso gamechild, jacugaz, susumila, escorbar, petra, and starford.

Landmarks are ziwa la NG'OMBE primary, Bombolulu workshop's, the acapulco pub and the flamingo hotel.

References

External links
 Bombolulu Workshops and Cultural Center
 Bombolulu School Of Promise

Mombasa County
Populated places in Coast Province